Roger Mas i Solé (born 1975 in Solsona, Lleida) is a Spanish Catalan singer–songwriter.

Biography
Mas was born in 1975 to a family of musicians. When he was five years old, he began playing instruments under the guidance of his grandfather. His artistic activity as a clarinet and saxophone player began when he was 12. In 1994, he started to investigate different musical expressions from around the world led by the expertise of Luis Paniagua.

In 1996, he won the Catalunya Ràdio Award, launching his career as a singer-songwriter. With nine albums, awards received for each new project and widespread acclaim from critics, he has become a true figure of the song.

His music is built upon the three pillars of modern music, traditional music and the ancestral sounds of the world. His lyrics mix the language of the street, literary words and expressions that are disappearing.

His voice has been described as the most beautiful ever to come from Catalan music. He has performed in France, Cuba, Italy, Uruguay, Serbia, United States and Brazil.

Recordings
 Les Flors del Somni (1997)
 Casafont (1999)
 Roger Mas & Les Flors en el camí de les serps i els llangardaixos blaus cap a la casa de vidre de la Senyora dels Guants Vermells (2001)
 dp (2003)
 Mística domèstica (2005)
 Les cançons tel·lúriques (2008)
 A la casa d'enlloc (2010)
 Roger Mas i la Cobla Sant Jordi - Ciutat de Barcelona (2012) Live album
 Irredempt (2015)
 Parnàs (2018)

Books
Flors, somnis, camins i serps (poems and songs) 1998
La teulada és oberta i no sé on són les parets (short stories, poetry and prose) 2000 edition:

References

External links
 Official webpage
 MySpace page
 Facebook page
 

Musicians from Catalonia
Singer-songwriters from Catalonia
1975 births
Living people
21st-century Spanish singers